The Port of Doom is a lost 1913 silent film detective drama directed by J. Searle Dawley and featuring Laura Sawyer and House Peters. It was the last of six "Kate Kirby's Cases" detective stories made in 1913, the third produced by the Famous Players Film Company after Dawley and Sawyer left Edison for Famous Players.

Cast
 Laura Sawyer as Kate Kirby
 House Peters as Kate's Father
 David Wall as Fuller (*as Dave Wall)
 Peter Lang as Fornton
 Hattie Forsythe as Vera Fornton
 Hal Clarendon as Capt. Giles
 Henrietta Goodman as Fuller's Wife

Kate Kirby's cases 
 The Diamond Crown. (Edison – 1913) 
 On the Broad Stairway. (Edison – 1913) 
 The Substitute Stenographer. (Edison – 1913) 
 Chelsea 7750. (Famous Players  - 1913)
 An Hour Before Dawn. (Famous Players  - 1913)
 The Port of  Doom. (Famous Players  - 1913)

References

External links
 The Port of Doom at IMDb.com
 set of 6 surviving Spanish language lobby cards (archived)
 Famous Players herald style advert

1913 films
American silent feature films
Lost American films
Films directed by J. Searle Dawley
American black-and-white films
Silent American drama films
1913 drama films
1913 lost films
Lost drama films
1910s American films